The 1970 Jacksonville State Gamecocks football team represented Jacksonville State University as a member of the Mid-South Athletic Conference (MSAC) during the 1970 NAIA Division I football season. Led by second-year head coach Charley Pell, the Gamecocks compiled an overall record of 10–0 with a mark of 5–0 in conference play, and finished as MSAC champion.

Schedule

References

Jacksonville State
Jacksonville State Gamecocks football seasons
College football undefeated seasons
Gulf South Conference football champion seasons
Jacksonville State Gamecocks football